Family with sequence similarity 177 member B (FAM177B) is a protein that in humans is encoded by the FAM177B gene. The other member of this family is FAM177A1.

References